Macey Ellen Kilty (born March 13, 2001) is an American freestyle wrestler. Kilty was runner up at 2020 United States Olympic Trials . Kilty was second at the 2019 Wrestling World Cup - Women's freestyle for Team USA. Kilty was second at the Golden Grand Prix Ivan Yarygin 2022. Kilty was Second at the U-23 World Cup in 2019 and 2018. Cadet World Champion in 2018, third in 2017.

References 

Freestyle wrestling
Female sport wrestlers